Domb is a surname. Notable people with this surname include:

 Allan Domb (born 1955), American real estate developer and politician
 Asi Domb (born 1974), Israeli football player and manager
 Cyril Domb (1920–2012), British-Israeli theoretical physicist
 Mindy Domb, American politician